"Ja-Da (Ja Da, Ja Da, Jing, Jing, Jing!)" is a hit song written in 1918 by Bob Carleton. The title is sometimes rendered simply as "Jada."  Ja-Da has flourished through the decades as a jazz standard.

In his definitive American Popular Songs, Alec Wilder writes about the song's simplicity:

Selected renditions of Ja-Da 
 Player piano roll, Vocalstyle Company, #11302. Vodvil Series, as played by Cliff Hess
 1918 — Original New Orleans Jazz Band
 1918 —  Arthur Fields
 1938 — Tommy Ladnier and Sidney Bechet
 1939 — Alice Faye sings it in the musical film Rose of Washington Square (1939)
 1945 — Bunk Johnson and Don Ewell
 1947 — Frank Sinatra & Peggy Lee
 1947 — Muggsy Spanier
 1954 — Big Chief Jazzband (on the 78 rpm record His Master's Voice A.L. 3401)
 1955 — Marian McPartland - At the Hickory House
 1957 — Pee Wee Hunt
 1958 — Ted Heath Orchestra
 1961 — Frankie Valli and The Four Seasons
 1982, 1986, and 1987 — Musical entertainers Sharon, Lois & Bram & The Mammoth Band, recorded live and in studio
 Al Hirt
 Oscar Peterson
 Erroll Garner
 Louis Armstrong
 Al Jarreau
 Hot Tuna as "Keep On Truckin'" 
 Johnny and The Hurricanes
 Bobby Hackett
 God-des and She
 The Fireballs, the band were singing that song, in 1966.
 Scott Walker chorus sung in song "Psoriatic" from 2006's The Drift
 Sonny Rollins 're-invented it' using the Ja-Da chords for his composition "Doxy" in 1954.

Rendition used in comedy 
 In the 1970s, the tune was appropriated by the Canadian comedy duo Maclean and Maclean, who recorded it as their signature piece, with bawdy lyrics added.

See also 
List of jazz contrafacts
List of pre-1920 jazz standards

Notes 

1918 songs
1910s jazz standards
1926 songs
American songs
Sixteen bar sections